Events from the year 1965 in Iran.

Incumbents
 Shah: Mohammad Reza Pahlavi 
 Prime Minister: Hassan-Ali Mansur (until January 26), Amir-Abbas Hoveida (starting January 26)

Events

Sports

 1965 World Weightlifting Championships

Establishments

 National Iranian Gas Company.

See also
 Years in Iraq
 Years in Afghanistan

References

 
Iran
Years of the 20th century in Iran
1960s in Iran
Iran